Charles H. Levis (June 21, 1860 – October 16, 1926) was a Major League Baseball first baseman in 1884 and 1885.

External links
Baseball-Reference page

1860 births
1926 deaths
19th-century baseball players
Baseball players from Missouri
Major League Baseball first basemen
Indianapolis Hoosiers (AA) players
Washington Nationals (UA) players
Baltimore Monumentals players
Baltimore Orioles (AA) players
Peoria Reds players
Macon (minor league baseball) players
Chattanooga Lookouts players
Binghamton Crickets (1880s) players
Leavenworth Soldiers players
Emporia Reds players
Eau Claire (minor league baseball) players
Dallas Hams players
Galveston Sand Crabs players
Waco Babies players
Bradford (minor league baseball) players
Montgomery Lambs players
Memphis Lambs players
Memphis Giants players
Minor league baseball managers